The President is a giant sequoia located in the Giant Forest of Sequoia National Park in the United States, east of Visalia, California. The President is the third-largest tree in the world, measured by volume of trunk, and the oldest-known living sequoia, about 3,200 years old.

The tree was named after President Warren G. Harding in 1923. Nearby trees include Chief Sequoyah, the 27th-largest giant sequoia in the world, and the Congress Group, two dense stands of medium-sized sequoias that represent the "House" and "Senate".

Description
The President features a dense crown with enormous branches reaching upward and outward. An especially prominent white branch is visible the western side of the tree's upper crown. A long, narrow burn scar is present on the north side of its trunk.

Dimensions

See also
 List of largest giant sequoias
 List of individual trees
 List of oldest trees

References

Individual giant sequoia trees
Sequoia National Park
Oldest trees